The 1977–78 All-Ireland Senior Club Hurling Championship was the eighth season of the All-Ireland Senior Club Hurling Championship, the Gaelic Athletic Association's premier club hurling tournament. The All-Ireland series began on 5 February 1978 and ended on 27 March 1978.

Glen Rovers were the defending champions, however, they failed to qualify. St. Finbarr's won the title after defeating Rathnure by 2-7 to 0-9 in the final.

Results

Connacht Senior Club Hurling Championship

Quarter-finals

Semi-final

Final

Leinster Senior Club Hurling Championship

First round

Quarter-finals

Semi-finals

Final

Munster Senior Club Hurling Championship

Quarter-finals

Semi-finals

Finals

Ulster Senior Club Hurling Championship

Final

All-Ireland Senior Club Hurling Championship

Quarter-final

Semi-final

Final

Statistics

Miscellaneous

 St. Finbarr's join fellow Cork clubs Blackrock and Glen Rovers by becoming the third team to win a second All-Ireland title.

References

1977 in hurling
1978 in hurling
All-Ireland Senior Club Hurling Championship